Jacques Ladègaillerie (born 10 January 1940) is a French fencer. He won a silver medal in the individual épée event at the 1972 Summer Olympics.

References

External links
 

1940 births
Living people
French male épée fencers
Olympic fencers of France
Fencers at the 1968 Summer Olympics
Fencers at the 1972 Summer Olympics
Fencers at the 1976 Summer Olympics
Olympic silver medalists for France
Olympic medalists in fencing
Medalists at the 1972 Summer Olympics
Union of Democrats and Independents politicians
20th-century French people